Lay Bid (also Romanized as Lāy Bīd; also known as Lābīd and Lāy Bīd) is a village in Zirkuh Rural District, Bagh-e Bahadoran District, Lenjan County, Isfahan Province, Iran. At the 2006 census, its population was 810, in 189 families.

References 

Populated places in Lenjan County